Free recoil is a vernacular term or jargon for recoil energy of a firearm not supported from behind. Free recoil denotes the translational kinetic energy (Et) imparted to the shooter of a small arm when discharged and is expressed in joules (J), or foot-pound force (ft·lbf) for non-SI units of measure. More generally, the term refers to the recoil of a free-standing firearm, in contrast to a firearm securely bolted to or braced by a massive mount or wall. Free recoil should not be confused with recoil:  
 Free recoil is the given name for translational kinetic energy transmitted from a small arm to a shooter. 
 Recoil is a name given for conservation of momentum as it generally applies to an everyday event.

Free recoil and firearms
Free recoil, sometimes called recoil energy, is a byproduct of the propulsive force from the powder charge held within a firearm chamber (metallic cartridge firearm) or breech (gunpowder firearm). The physical event of free recoil occurs when a powder charge is deflagrated within a firearm, resulting in the conversion of chemical energy held within the powder charge into thermodynamic energy. This energy is then transferred to the base of the bullet and to the rear of the cartridge or breech, propelling the firearm rearward into the shooter while the projectile is propelled forward down the barrel, with increasing velocity, to the muzzle. The rearward energy of the firearm is the free recoil and the forward energy of the bullet is the muzzle energy.

The concept of free recoil comes from the tolerability of gross recoil energy. Trying to figure the net recoil energy of a firearm (also known as felt recoil) is a futile endeavor. Even if the recoil energy loss can be calculated, due to: 
 use and effect of a muzzle brake 
 recoil operated action or gas operated action
 mercury or spring recoil suppression tube 
 recoil reducing butt pad and or hand grip 
 damping padded shooting vest or gloves 
the factors of human perception are not calculable.

Therefore, free recoil stands as a scientific measurement of recoil energy, just as the room or outside temperature is measured. The comfort level of a shooter's ability to tolerate free recoil is a personal perception. Just as it is a person's personal perception of how comfortable he or she feels to room or outside temperature.

There are many factors that determine how a shooter will perceive the free recoil of a firearm. Some of the factors are: 
 body mass and body frame 
 experience (how to best tolerate free recoil)
 shooting position 
 recoil suppression equipment 
 firearm fit and environmental stressors

Calculating free recoil
There are several different ways to calculate free recoil. However, the two most common are the momentum short and long forms. Both forms will yield the same value.

The short form uses one equation as where the long form requires two equations. The long form finds the velocity for the fire arm. With the velocity known for the small arm, the free recoil of the small arm can be calculated using the translational kinetic energy equation.

 Momentum short form: 
 Momentum long form:    →   

Where as:

Etgu is the translational kinetic energy of the small arm as expressed by the joule (J).

mgu is the weight of the small arm expressed in kilograms (kg).

mp is the weight of the projectile expressed in grams (g).

mc is the weight of the powder charge expressed in grams (g).

vgu is the velocity of the small arm expressed in meters per second (m/s).

vp is the velocity of the projectile expressed in meters per second (m/s).

vc is the velocity of the powder charge expressed in meters per second (m/s).

1000 is the conversion factor to set the equation equal to kilograms.

Calculating free recoil using SI units, example 
Small arm: Mauser 1898 action, chambered in 7×57mm Mauser, rifle weighing 4.54 kilograms (10 pounds).

Projectile:	of spitzer type, weighing 9.1 grams (140 grains), with a muzzle velocity of 823 meters per second (2,700 feet per second).

Powder charge: single base nitrocellulose, weighing 2.75 grams (42.5 grains), with a powder charge velocity of 1,585 meters per second (5,200 feet per second).

The momentum short form:

and with the numeric values in place;

 of free recoil

For non-SI units of measure of energy see foot-pound force. The conversion is: 1 J = 0.737 562 ft·lbf

Calculating free recoil using non-SI units

From the momentum long form in both Imperial units of measure and in an English Engineering format:
 Momentum long form:    →   

Whereas:

Etgu is the translational kinetic energy of the small arm as expressed by the foot-pound force (ft·lbf).

mgu is the weight of the small arm expressed in pounds (lb).

mp is the weight of the projectile expressed in grains (gr).

mc is the weight of the powder charge expressed in grains (gr).

vgu is the velocity of the small arm expressed in feet per second (ft/s).

vp is the velocity of the projectile expressed in feet per second (ft/s).

vc is the velocity of the powder charge expressed in feet per second (ft/s).

gc is the dimensional constant and is the numeral coefficient of 32.1739

7000 is the conversion factor to set the equation equal to pounds.

Calculated free recoil for small arms
The following free recoil energy table does not take into consideration: recoil suppression devices, or loss of energy due to auto loading mechanism. English units of measure are enclosed in parentheses.

Handguns

Rifles

Shotguns

Black powder firearms

See also
Kinetic energy
Momentum

See physics of firearms for a more detailed discussion.

Resources
Arthur B. Alphin, Any Shot You Want, The A-Square Handloading and Rifle Manual, On Target Press, 1996.
Edward F. Obert, Thermodynamics, McGraw-Hill Book Co., 1948.
McGraw-Hill Encyclopedia of Science and Technology, volume ice-lev, 9th Edition, McGraw-Hill, 2002.

References

Firearm terminology